Nico Brown (born 11 August 1998) is a professional footballer player who plays as a winger and forward for Lexington SC in USL League One. Born in the United States, he represents Jamaica internationally.

Career

Youth, College & Amateur
Brown played high school soccer at McDonogh School, where he was a two-time USYSA National Champion and MVP, as well as the USYSA National Championships Golden Boot Winner in 2015. In 2014, Brown was an all-state and all-metro selection in 2014 after scoring 18 goals and assisting eight others as a junior. He also played club soccer with Baltimore Celtic, and spent a year with the D.C. United academy as a senior.

In 2016, Brown attended Loyola University Maryland to play college soccer, where he went on to make 62 appearances, scoring nine goals and tallying five assists. In 2018, Brown was named All-Patriot League Second Team, and in 2019 was an All-Patriot League Third Team.

While at college, Brown also played in the USL PDL with Baltimore Bohemians during their 2016, making three appearances. In 2019, he played with NPSL side FC Baltimore Christos, but didn't appear for the club.

Professional career
For their Spring 2021 season, Brown joined NISA side Maryland Bobcats. He played three of the team's NISA Legends Cup matches, scoring a goal against California United Strikers, and made five regular season appearances. He returned to the team for the Fall 2021 season and made two more starts.

On September 1, 2021, Brown transferred to USL League One club Greenville Triumph. Following the 2022 season, his contract option was declined by Greenville.

Brown signed with USL League One expansion club Lexington SC on January 20, 2023.

International
Brown is of Jamaican heritage and has represented Jamaica at under-17 level.

References

External links
 

1998 births
Living people
People from Elkridge, Maryland
Soccer players from Maryland
Jamaican footballers
Jamaica youth international footballers
American soccer players
Association football forwards
Baltimore Bohemians players
Maryland Bobcats FC players
Greenville Triumph SC players
Lexington SC players
Loyola Greyhounds men's soccer players
National Premier Soccer League players
National Independent Soccer Association players
USL League One players
USL League Two players
American people of Jamaican descent